The 1969 Cincinnati Bengals season was the team's second year as a franchise, and their final season in professional football's American Football League (AFL).

Head coach Paul Brown drafted quarterback Greg Cook of the University of Cincinnati in the first round.

The same draft also produced linebacker Bill Bergey.

The Bengals jumped out to a 3–0 record, but finished 4–9–1 in their final season at Nippert Stadium, before moving to their brand new facility the following season.

The November 9, 1969 Bengals vs. Oilers game at the Astrodome in Houston is unique in Bengals history, as it is the only non-overtime tie game. Cincinnati played its first regular-season tie that afternoon, catching the Oilers at 31–31 on kicker Horst Muhlmann's 18-yard field goal with 0:22 left in the fourth quarter. Regular-season overtime was not in the rule book at that time.

The oldest season record in Bengals history, and the only one still standing from the Nippert Stadium years, is QB Greg Cook's average of 9.41 yards gained per passing attempt in 1969. The only other average of more than nine yards was 9.21 by QB Boomer Esiason in 1988. Cook went on to pass for 1,854 yards and led the Bengals to wins over the Oakland Raiders and the eventual Super Bowl Champion Kansas City Chiefs.

Offseason

Common draft

Personnel

Staff

Roster

Regular season

Schedule

Standings

Team stats

Team leaders
Passing: Greg Cook (197 Att, 106 Comp, 1854 Yds, 53.8 Pct, 15 TD, 11 Int, 88.3 Rating) 
Rushing: Jess Phillips (118 Att, 578 Yds, 4.9 Avg, 83 Long, 3 TD) 
Receiving: Eric Crabtree (40 Rec, 855 Yds, 21.4 Avg, 73 Long, 7 TD) 
Scoring: Horst Muhlmann, 80 points (16 FG; 32 PAT)

Awards and records

AFL Coach of the Year
Paul Brown

AFL Passing Title
Greg Cook

AFL Defensive Rookie of the Year
Bill Bergey

AFL Pro Bowl Selections
RB Paul Robinson
TE Bob Trumpy

References

External links
 1969 Cincinnati Bengals at Pro-Football-Reference.com

Cincinnati Bengals
Cincinnati Bengals seasons
Cincinnati